Liam Banks (born 3 June 1999) is an English cricketer. He made his first-class debut for Warwickshire in the 2017 County Championship on 19 September 2017. In December 2017, he was named in England's squad for the 2018 Under-19 Cricket World Cup. He made his List A debut on 19 April 2019, for Warwickshire in the 2019 Royal London One-Day Cup. He made his T20 debut on 21 July 2019, for Warwickshire against Leicestershire, in the 2019 t20 Blast. Banks was released by Warwickshire ahead of the 2021 County Championship.

References

External links
 
 Liam Banks at Warwickshire County Cricket Club

1999 births
Living people
English cricketers
Warwickshire cricketers
Sportspeople from Newcastle-under-Lyme
Staffordshire cricketers